German queen is the informal title used when referring to the wife of the king of the Kingdom of Germany. The official titles of the wives of German kings were Queen of the Germans and later Queen of the Romans (Königin der Römer).

Empress Maria Theresa (1745–1780) is often considered to be a ruler in her own right, as she was Queen regnant of Bohemia and Hungary, and despite her husband being elected as Holy Roman Emperor, it was she who ruled the Empire and continued to do so even after the death of her husband before ruling jointly with her son Emperor Joseph II.

German (East Francian) Queens

With the Treaty of Verdun in 843, the Carolingian Empire was divided. Lothair, the King of the middle Kingdom of Lotharingia or Burgundy, obtained the title of Emperor; Louis obtained Eastern Francia, the area which would become Germany. The wives of that realm's Kings are thus German Queens (or more precisely, East Francian Queens – 'Germany' is historically deemed to have developed with the election of Henry the Fowler), but not always Empresses.

Carolingian

Conradine

German Queens
With the elevation of Otto I of Germany in 962 to the Imperial title, the title 'Roman King/Emperor' became inaliably associated with the Kingdom of Germany – although a King of Germany might not bear the Imperial title, it would eventually become impossible to conceive of a Holy Roman Emperor not being King of Germany (a viewpoint reinforced with the equation of King of the Romans with King of Germany from the 12th century). Thus, the following women, though not all Holy Roman Empresses, were all Queens of Germany, and – from the inception of the Hohenstaufen dynasty – all Queens of the Romans.

Ottonian Dynasty

Salian Dynasty

House of Supplinburg

House of Hohenstaufen (1)

House of Welf

House of Hohenstaufen (2)

House of Habsburg (1)

House of Nassau

House of Habsburg (2)

House of Luxemburg (1)

House of Habsburg (3)

House of Wittelsbach (1)

House of Luxemburg (2)

House of Wittelsbach (2)

House of Luxemburg (3)

House of Habsburg (4)

House of Wittelsbach (3)

House of Habsburg-Lorraine

Consorts of disputed Kings
In addition to the above, the following women were the wives of men who made claim to the Kingship of Germany, but who are not recognised as official Kings:
 Adelheid of Savoy (d.1080). She was the wife of Rudolf of Rheinfeld, anti-King between 1077 and 1080.
 Beatrice of Brabant (1225 – 11 November 1288). On 10 March 1241, she became the second wife of Henry Raspe, anti-King between 1246 and 1247.
 Elisabeth of Brunswick-Lüneburg (d.1266). She was the wife of William II of Holland, who was elected as an anti-King of Germany in 1247. He was crowned King of the Romans at Aachen in 1248, and married Elizabeth in 1252.
 Sanchia of Provence (1225–1261) and Beatrice of Falkenburg (d.1277). They were the second and third (m.1269) wives respectively of Richard of Cornwall, who was elected King of Germany and of the Romans in 1257, in the hope that he would reestablish order in Germany. He was crowned King of the Romans by the Pope at Aachen in 1257; with him was crowned Sanchia.
 Violant of Aragon (1236–1301). She was the wife of Alfonso X of Castile, who claimed and was elected as anti-King to the German throne in 1257 as a grandson of Philip of Swabia. Alfonso never visited Germany, held no authority there, and relinquished his claims in 1275.
 Elisabeth von Hohnstein (died c. 4 April 1380). She was the wife of Günther von Schwarzburg, who was elected King of Germany and of the Romans in place of Louis IV on 30 January 1348, but who was forced to resign his claims by Charles IV on 24 May 1349.

See also
 List of Holy Roman Empresses
 List of German monarchs

 
German